Anita Alaire Afoke Asuoha is a Nigerian Nigerian award winning stand up comedienne, actor,  social media sensation host, life coach and humanitarian, known by her stage name Real Warri Pikin.

Personal life 
Anita Asuoha was born on 29th of October 1990,and brought up in Warri, Delta State, Nigeria. Her father is of Ijaw tribe from Burutu Local Government Area of Delta State while her mother is of Urhobo tribe. She is the third of six children. She studied Political Science/Public Administration at the Benson Idahosa University Benin City and graduated in 2012. She married Mr. Victor Ikechukwu Asuoha  in 2013,with three kids.

Real Warri Pikin run a non-governmental organization called Real Warri Pikin Foundation. The organization enables women every International Women’s Day by investing in their future through the 100k challenge, a grants opportunity for women. Her depression and suicide story propelled her humanitarian segment that has led to her to advocate for and help depressed and suicidal people in the society

Career 
In 2008, she contested in the ‘Glo Rock ‘N’ Rule dance competition’ and won the first position. She was named a Globacom ambassador in 2009. In 2011, she auditioned in ‘The Maltina Dance All family competition’ and finished as second overall best with her family. She has performed as a comedian in many events in Nigeria including Warri again, Akpororo vs akpororo, Man on fire, and the AY show. She also performs as a compere in many events across the country. Anita Asuoha's stage name is ‘Real Warri Pikin’.. She is an on-air-personality with a show titled "Real Talk With Real Warri Pikin on Max 90.9 FM Radio Station Abuja. 

She hosted the biggest comedy show in Warri 1 August 2021, titled REAL WARRI PIKIN UNFILTERED. The show has been held in Abuja, Warri, Ghana, Milton Keynes, Manchester, and London She has performed in Ghana, Senegal, U.S.A, and Nigeria. She has also performed at Warri Again?, AY LIVE, Bovi’s ‘Man on Fire’ etc. Real Warri Pikin hosts a comedy show.

Real Warri Pikin has also featured in Nollywood films like Prophetess, Fate of Alakada, Aki and Pawpaw, The Ghost and the Tout Too, The Stand Up, Intricate, Lemonade, Merry Men 2, etc. In January 2021 she dropped her series titled 'School of Thought' and released its music single ‘School Of Thought’ featuring TENI. In October 2021, She launched her clothing line titled ‘Real Warri Pikin Merch’ https://realwarripikinmerch.com/

Recognition and Awards 
The Humor Awards for Most creative comedy show 2022
The Humor Awards for Stand up comedian of the year 2022 
African Choice Award Comedy Act Of The Year 2022

See also 
List of Nigerian Comedians

References

External links 
 Real Warri Pikin on Instagram

Living people
Nigerian women television presenters
Nigerian television personalities
Benson Idahosa University alumni
Year of birth missing (living people)